Mountune Racing is a specialist automotive engineering company.  It was formed in 1980 in Maldon, Essex by David Mountain to provide Mini race engines.

In the late 1980s, Mountune started preparing Cosworth YB engines for numerous motorsport championships. David Mountain quickly realised the potential of this twin cam, 4 valve turbocharged engine and started development for race and rally applications.  Mountune’s team of engineers worked closely with Ford’s own motorsport group based at the Boreham facility in the UK to supply various works teams and hundreds of privateers with Ford YB engines, forging a long-term association with Ford Motor Company. 

In 1990, the Mountune powered Ford Sierra RS500 of Robb Gravett won the British Touring Car Championship, resulting in Mountune supplying race winning engines to customers around the world. In the early ’90s, Group A rallying was the pinnacle of its sport and the works Escort Cosworth’s were all powered by Mountune built, 2-litre Ford YB engines.

To date, Mountune has supplied engines for road and rally racing, supporting championship teams from Ford, Formula Palmer Audi, Ascari and Petronas/Proton.  In 2009, they were contracted to build the new Audi race engines for the new FIA Formula Two Championship. The company currently provides both Ford and Subaru engines for the British Touring Car Championship.

Drivers who have used Mountune engines include, Robb Gravett, Stig Blomqvist, Colin McRae, Mohammed bin Sulayem, François Delecour, Carlos Sainz Sr., Malcolm Wilson, Pentti Airikkala, Robbie Head, Miki Biasion, Gwyndaf Evans, Juha Kankkunen, Tommi Mäkinen, Guy Smith and Tom Chilton.

The company was acquired by Roush Industries in 2004, joining expertise and premises with Roush Europe in Brentwood, England. In 2008, after a Roush Europe management buyout, the parent company became Revolve Technologies Ltd.

Highlights

References

External links
Mountune Racing home

Automotive companies established in 1980
Auto parts suppliers of the United Kingdom
Automotive motorsports and performance companies
1980 establishments in the United Kingdom